Shockheaded Peter is a 1998 musical using the popular German children's book Struwwelpeter (1845) by Heinrich Hoffmann as its basis.

Created by Julian Bleach, Anthony Cairns, Julian Crouch, Graeme Gilmour, Tamzin Griffin, Jo Pocock, Phelim McDermott, Michael Morris and The Tiger Lillies (Martyn Jacques, Adrian Huge and Adrian Stout) the production combines elements of pantomime and puppetry with musical versions of the poems with the songs generally following the text but with a somewhat darker tone. Whereas the children in the poems only sometimes die, in the musical they all do. Commissioned by the West Yorkshire Playhouse in Leeds and the Lyric Hammersmith in West London, the show debuted in 1998 in Leeds before moving to London and subsequently to world tours.

Productions
 1998 West Yorkshire Playhouse
 1999 New Victory Theater
 1999 Kennedy Center Eisenhower Theater
 2000 American Conservatory Theater San Francisco
 2001 Athenaeum Theatre Chicago
 2004 Lyric Hammersmith
 2005 Little Shubert Theatre
 2006 ETA Hoffmann Theater Bamberg
 2008 Theater Krefeld und Mönchengladbach
 2008 die SCHOTTE. Erfurt
 2009 Burgtheater
 2010 Grillo-Theater Essen
 2011 Theater Heidelberg
 2013 Det Norske Teatret
 2013 Freilichtspiele Schwäbisch Hall
 2014 Staatstheater Cottbus
 2015 Company One
 2015 Green Valley Theatre Company
 2015 Schauspiel Hannover
 2016 Slovene National Theatre Nova Gorica
 2017 Cygnet Theatre, San Diego
 2017 Black Button Eyes Productions, Chicago
 2021 Jobsite Theater, Tampa
 2021 New Moon Theatre, Memphis
 2022 Staatstheater Meiningen

Awards and nominations
Awards
 1998 Barclays/TMA Best Director Award
 1999 Critics' Circle Theatre Award for Best Design
 2002 Laurence Olivier Award for Best Entertainment
 2002 Laurence Olivier Award for Best Performance in a Supporting Role (Martyn Jacques)

Nominations 
 1999 South Bank Show Award Theatre
 2000 Drama Desk Award for Unique Theatrical Experience
 2000 Drama Desk Award for Best Set Design for a Musical
 2000 Drama Desk Award for Best Costume Design
 2002 Laurence Olivier Award for Best Director
 2002 Laurence Olivier Award for Best Set Design
 2002 Laurence Olivier Award for Best Costume Design

References

Further reading

External links
 
 
 

1998 musicals
Critics' Circle Theatre Award-winning musicals
Fringe theatre
Musicals based on novels
Off-Broadway musicals
Laurence Olivier Award-winning musicals
West End musicals
British musicals